Brachyscome decipiens, commonly known as field daisy, is a perennial herb in the family Asteraceae and is endemic to Australia. It is a small herb with white or pale blue flowers.

Description
Brachyscome decipiens is a herb with leaves that are whorled at the ground. The leaf edges are smooth or toothed near the apex, surface smooth, sometimes purplish near the leaf base. Flowering occurs from September to March.

Taxonomy and naming
Brachyscome decipiens was first formally described in 1847 by Joseph Dalton Hooker and the description was published in the London Journal of Botany. The specific epithet (decipiens) is derived from the Latin word decipio meaning "to beguile" or "to cheat".

Distribution and habitat
Field daisy grows in subalpine and mountainous woodland and swamps in Victoria, Tasmania and New South Wales.

References

decipiens
Flora of Tasmania
Plants described in 1847
Taxa named by Joseph Dalton Hooker